The House of teacher is an ancient mansion in the central part of Taganrog.

History 
The ancient mansion, one-story with semi-basement, on Petrovskaya St. 89 is built at the beginning of the 19th century. In the list of monuments of history and architecture is registered as the building of Commercial court. A household belonged: since 1807 — to the gardener of the gardens Manoylo Laskaraki; from 1873 to 1880 — to the honorary citizen of Taganrog Dmitry Laskaraki; from 1890 to 1906 — to E. Aleksopulo's successors; in 1915 — to the honorary citizen of Taganrog V. I. Voronin.

According to the map of the city of 1863 – in a household "The commercial court in the private house" was placed. Since 1912 – private school of the I category E. M. Granovsky (a course of men's gymnasiums – four main classes) with an annual payment of 120 rubles.

Since December 3, 1943, in a household, the House of pioneers which existed here till February 1944 (it was transferred to the building of Children's music school of P.I. Tchaikovsky) opened. Then in the building, the Teacher's club (The house of workers of education) was arranged.

In 1947 on the basis of the Taganrog Teacher's club, the pianist and the e vocalist Ivan Fedorovich Changli-Cha, skin created amateur collective from gifted singers, his pupils: A. Agureev, T. Pocatello, N. Petrova, Zh. Khlebnikova, I. Khlebnikov, A. Larin, E. Manyukhin, F. Novikov, I. Filippov, A. Vorobyov, A. Gevorkova, A. Gladkov and others. Actors worked on scenes and arias from operas A.G. Rubenstein's "Demon", "Aida" by D. Verdi, P. I. Tchaikovsky's Mazeppa and others., киноклуб «400 ударов» Михаила Басова

From the 1960th until the end of the 1980th years in the Teacher's club there was the well-known Folk theater of the drama which was directed by B. Potik, then V. Rogulchenko. At Folk theater, such remarkable actors as V. Vetrov, S. Makhovsky, A. Kuleshov, V. Hodgkin, etc. played.

At the mo, meaning in the building, there is a Local government office of culture "Youth center". In its walls the Commonwealth of Actors of Don theater and Nonna Malygina Theatre, a film society of "400 blows" of Mikhail Basov, Alexey Yakovlev's fine art studio work now.

References 

Tourist attractions in Taganrog
Buildings and structures in Taganrog